The Pavesi case refers to the death of a ten-year-old Brazilian boy Paulo Veronesi Pavesi (Poços de Caldas, 1990 — Poços de Caldas, April 21, 2000).

Death 
Pavesi died on April 21, 2000, in the Santa Casa of the city of Poços de Caldas, in the state of Minas Gerais. The case began on April 19, 2000, when ten-year-old Paulo Veronesi Pavesi accidentally fell from the building where he lives. Pavesi was taken to Hospital Pedro Sanches and, two days later, on April 21, 2000, he was transferred to the city's Santa Casa, where brain death was observed. The boy's organs were transplanted. 

According to Justice, the doctors were responsible for incorrect procedures in the declaration of death and removal of the boy's organs. The exam that pointed to brain death had been falsified and the boy was still alive as his organs were removed. The case launched several lawsuits and opened wide allegations of irregularities in the organ transplant scheme in Poços de Caldas. On March 30, 2021, the Brazilian justice sentenced two doctors who treated Pavesi, José Luis Gomes da Silva and José Luis Bonfitto, to 25 years and 10 months in prison and payment of a fine, while Marco Alexandre Pacheco da Fonseca was acquitted by the jury. The other doctors have yet to be judged.

References

Organ trade